Wager Glacier is a small, heavily crevassed glacier on the east coast of Alexander Island, Antarctica. It occupies a trench-like valley and flows east into George VI Sound immediately south of Marr Bluff. The glacier was surveyed in 1948 by the Falkland Islands Dependencies Survey and named by them for Lawrence R. Wager, Arctic explorer and professor of geology at Oxford University.

See also
 List of glaciers in the Antarctic
 Hampton Glacier
 Hushen Glacier
 Tumble Glacier

References

Glaciers of Alexander Island